Graham George Willars known as Graham Willars (20 November 1939 - 20 September 1997) was an English rugby union flanker who played a 338 games for Leicester Tigers from 1959 to 1987, he also coached the side from 1982–87 and was club president from 1991–93.

Playing career

Willars made his Leicester debut as a 19 year old on 17 October 1959 against Cheltenham at Welford Road and played 21 times in his first season.  However competition for places was fierce and in 1960/61 he played only 5 times and did not feature at all in either 1961/62 or 1962/63.  Willars reappeared in the first team against Waterloo in December 1962 and was then a feature in the team for many years.  Willars was club captain in 1968/69 and then again in 1972/73.

Willars' career lasted 27 years and 169 days, spanning 1,154 Tigers games, the longest by both measures of any player for Leicester Tigers.  He featured as a player in a record 20 different seasons.  At 47 years and 135 days he is also the oldest player to play for the club.

Coaching and administration career

Willars succeeded Chalkie White as Tigers' first team coach and lead the side from 1982–87 leading the side to the final of the 1982-83 John Player Cup, where the side lost to Bristol.

Sources
Farmer,Stuart & Hands, David Tigers-Official History of Leicester Football Club (The Rugby DevelopmentFoundation )

W is for Graham Willars

References

1939 births
1997 deaths
English rugby union players
Rugby union flankers
Rugby union players from Leicester
Leicester Tigers players
Leicester Tigers coaches